The Nam Khan (Lao: ນ້ຳຄານ) is a river in Laos that is a major tributary of the river Mekong, with which it joins at Luang Prabang.

Rivers of Laos